Taka Perry (born 18 October 1998) is an Australian-Japanese music producer, songwriter and artist from Canberra, Australia. His past collaborations include Ruel, Denzel Curry, GoldLink, Sycco, Wifisfuneral, M-Phazes, Mick Schultz, Max Frost, and Isaiah Firebrace. He is represented by Flagrant Artists Management and published worldwide by Concord Music Group.

Early life
Taka Perry was born and raised in Canberra, Australia to an American father and Japanese mother. He played a variety of instruments from a young age, and on his 12th birthday his parents bought him a digital audio workstation called Studio One which sparked his interest in production. He is fluent in both English and Japanese.

Career

2015–2019
In 2015, while attending high school at Narrabundah College, he met Robert Conley through a school songwriting program run by APRA AMCOS.
Upon graduating, he relocated to Sydney to pursue a career in music, with Conley acting as a mentor in his early career. In 2018, he worked as an additional producer on Ruel's debut EP Ready, including the ARIA platinum-certified single "Younger". He co-wrote "Money Problems" by Max Frost, released via Atlantic Records, which was performed on Live with Kelly and Ryan and saw a sync on MTV show The Hills, as well as being shortlisted for the 2019 Vanda & Young Competition.

In July 2019, Perry announced a record deal signing with TMRW Music, followed by the release of his debut single "Introspect", which saw a TV sync for Australian television miniseries Secret Bridesmaids' Business on Channel 7. In August 2019, he announced a global publishing deal with Downtown Music, followed by the release of his second single "Kuruna", featuring Japanese hip-hop artist JP THE WAVY. In December 2019, Perry released his third single "21 Orbits", featuring Sydney rapper Yaw and Bendigo singer Yergurl, which received a full rotation add on Triple J and saw him as the Unearthed feature artist.

2020
In January 2020, Perry was invited to produce a song live on air on Triple J in 30 minutes, using suggestions from the text line as inspiration. In May 2020, he released his fourth single "Only U" featuring Gia Vorne, which also saw a full rotation add on Triple J. In June 2020, Perry released an official remix of Painkiller by Ruel featuring Denzel Curry via RCA Records. In July 2020, Perry performed a cover of Kanye West's "Jesus Walks" for  Triple J's Like a Version segment, featuring Western Sydney musician A.Girl. The performance was met with critical acclaim, with Rolling Stone Australia calling it "an anthem for the current times." Perry also performed his single "Only U" with Gia Vorne on vocals.

Perry's fifth single "Diamonds" was released in November 2020, which saw him incorporate his vocals into his production for the first time. The single was met positively, and in December he was announced as the 15th most played artist on Triple J Unearthed for that year.

2021

In March 2021, Perry released his sixth single "Twenty" featuring Wollongong R&B artist Stevan. The following month, he was a performer at the APRA Music Awards of 2021. In May 2021, he was nominated for an APRA PDA Award. In July 2021, Perry released an official remix of "Stranger Love" by PNAU featuring Budjerah. In October, he released "1234", a collaboration with Greek-Japanese rapper Leon Fanourakis, before releasing his eighth single "Operator" in December.

2022
In February 2022, Perry co-wrote and produced "When I'm With You" by Isaiah Firebrace and Evie Irie, which will be performed at Eurovision - Australia Decides.

Selected discography

Production / songwriting

Singles

Remixes

References

External links
 Official Website

Living people
1998 births
Australian record producers
Australian songwriters